Santolaya is one of six parishes (administrative divisions)  in Cabranes, a municipality within the province and autonomous community of Asturias, in northern Spain.

Villages
 Arboleya
 Arriondu
 Bospolín
 Carabañu
 Güerdies
 Madiéu
 Mases
 Santolaya
 Villanueva

Other minor entities include: Argamia, Artín, El Cantu, La Casa'l Monte, La Casa'l Ríu, El Colláu, Felguerúa, El Fondón, Fonfría, Llamuñu, La Llana, La Llantada, La Llavona, La Obra, Oles, L'Ordinayu, El Préstamu, La Quintana, La Rozada, Sendín, La Soma, Les Vegues and La Viña.

References

Parishes in Cabranes